Eduardo Andres Lucio III (born December 19, 1978)  is a former Democratic member of the Texas House of Representatives, having represented Texas's 38th District from 2007 until 2021.

Early life and education 

Lucio was born and raised in Brownsville, Texas. He attended James Pace High School in Brownsville. Upon graduation, he attended Texas Tech University on an athletic scholarship. He later received a BBA from the University of Texas at Austin. In 2005, he received his Doctorate of Jurisprudence from the University of Texas School of Law.

Election history 
Lucio was first elected to the Texas House of Representatives in 2006. He won re-election in 2008, 2010, 2012, 2014, 2016, 2018, and 2020. Lucio represented District 38, which is composed of the southwest region of Cameron County.

On January 18, 2022, Lucio announced he would resign in order to focus on his personal life. His resignation was effective on January 31, 2022.

2006

2008 

In 2008, Lucio ran unopposed for the first time.

2010 

In 2010, Lucio ran unopposed for a second time.

2012

2014

2016

In 2016, Lucio ran unopposed in both the Democratic primary and the general election.

2018

In 2016, Lucio ran unopposed in both the Democratic primary and the general election.

2020

Personal life 
Lucio is currently an attorney in South Texas focusing on water law and policy. Lucio is a franchise owner for Orangetheory Fitness and Romeo's Pizza in South Texas.

His father, Eddie Lucio Jr., is a Democratic member of the Texas Senate.

References

External links
Texas House of Representatives - Eddie Lucio III official TX House website
Project Vote Smart - Representative Eddie Lucio III (TX) profile
Follow the Money - Eddie Lucio III
2006 campaign contributions
Generational Lines Reveal a Split in Texas Family's Vote
Eddie Lucio III's Myspace Profile

Democratic Party members of the Texas House of Representatives
1978 births
Living people
People from Brownsville, Texas
Texas lawyers
University of Texas alumni
University of Texas School of Law alumni
21st-century American politicians